Brewster High School is a comprehensive public secondary school in Brewster, New York, for grades 9 – 12 with an enrollment of approximately 1,100 students and over 110 teachers and support personnel.

Notable alumni

 Michael Imperioli (1983), actor

References

External links
Brewster Central School District Home Page

Public high schools in New York (state)
Schools in Putnam County, New York